Renaissance Seattle Hotel is a hotel in Seattle, in the U.S. state of Washington. It has more than 500 rooms.

The 28-story hotel was built in 1983. It received a $28 million remodel in 2010, and another renovation in 2016.

References

External links 

 Renaissance Seattle Hotel at Marriott
 Renaissance Seattle Hotel at U.S. News & World Report

Downtown Seattle
Hotels in Seattle